Peter Blakeley (born 8 March 1946) is a Canadian bobsledder. He competed in the four man event at the 1972 Winter Olympics.

References

1946 births
Living people
Canadian male bobsledders
Olympic bobsledders of Canada
Bobsledders at the 1972 Winter Olympics
Sportspeople from Montreal